Asii Chemnitz Narup (born 1954) is a Greenlandic politician and MP for the party Inuit Ataqatigiit. Narup was the country's environmental and health minister between 2005 and 2006. She resigned in protest against what she felt was a poorly functioning government.  She is currently the mayor of Sermersooq.

References

1954 births
Living people
Mayors of Nuuk
Inuit Ataqatigiit politicians
Greenlandic socialists
Greenlandic Inuit people
Greenlandic people of Danish descent 
21st-century Danish women politicians
21st-century Greenlandic politicians
Women government ministers of Greenland
Environment ministers of Greenland
Family ministers of Greenland
Finance ministers of Greenland
Health ministers of Greenland
Interior ministers of Greenland